The Tulane Journal of Technology and Intellectual Property (JTIP) is a student-edited journal of the Tulane University Law School. JTIP examines legal issues relating to technology, including topics such as antitrust, computer law, contracts, constitutional law, copyrights, information privacy, patents, torts, trade secrets, trademarks, and all other policy implications of law and technology in society.

Membership
JTIP's editorial members are second- and third-year law students who work under the guidance of faculty advisors.  Membership is determined by an annual write-on competition.

2022-2023 Board
Editor in Chief: Hayley LeBlanc
Senior Managing Editor: Harry Phillips
Senior Notes & Comments Editor: Hong Nguyen
Senior Articles Editor: Caroline Wippman
Senior Business Editor: Marissa Kinsey

2021-2022 Board

Editor in Chief: Kaitlyn Rodnick
Senior Managing Editor: Charlie Jonas
Senior Notes & Comments Editor: Gabrielle Balasquide
Senior Articles Editor: Rebecca Alba
Senior Business Editor: Sarah Hunt-Blackwell

2016-2017 Board
Editor in Chief: Casey Ebner
Senior Articles Editor: Jake Kronish

2015-2016 Board

Editor in Chief: Alexandra Triana
Senior Managing Editor: Joshua Mastracci
Senior Notes & Comments Editor: Alexandrea Kinzinger
Senior Articles Editor: Lillian Grappe
Senior Business Editor: Kyle Sutton
Senior Symposium Editor: Caitlin Poor
Senior Communications Editor: Toni Xu

2011-2012 Board

Editor in Chief: Chad Sanders
Senior Managing Editor: Matthew DeIulio
Senior Notes & Comments Editor: Russell Withers
Senior Business Editor: Jacklina Len
Senior Communications Editor: Brooke Childers

Significant articles

See also
Intellectual property law
List of intellectual property law journals 
Tulane University Law School

References

External links
  
  
 

Intellectual property law journals
American law journals
Technology law journals
Tulane University Law School
Annual journals
Publications established in 1996
Law journals edited by students